Manutchehr Salimi Galangaschi was an Iranian politician from north of Iran, Amarlu District. He studied bachelor of Political Science. He received his PhD in International law from The National University of Iran (Daneschgah e Melli e Iran) in Tehran.

Early life 
He was born in Galangasch village, Amarlu District, Rudbar County, Gilan Province in Iran.

Member of Parliament 
He was a member of parliament from Rudbar County. He was elected by 11742 out of 19143 votes in 24th election for Iranian National Parliament. He was vice president of Parliamentary Commission for Rural Affairs.

Death 
He was executed in Evin Prison by Islamic Republicans.

References 

 پادوسبان
 irancpi.net
 وب‌گاه دکتر ناصر انقطاع

Rastakhiz Party politicians
Politicians executed during the Iranian Revolution
Year of birth missing
Year of death missing
People from Gilan Province